Tres Palacios River is a river in Texas that rises near El Campo, flows in a southerly direction, and empties into Tres Palacios Bay, an arm of Matagorda Bay.

See also
List of rivers of Texas

References

USGS Geographic Names Information Service
USGS Hydrologic Unit Map - State of Texas (1974)

Rivers of Texas
Rivers of Matagorda County, Texas
Rivers of Wharton County, Texas